D'Love is a 2010 Indonesian feature film written, directed and produced by Helfi Kardit. It stars Aurelie Moeremans, Agung Saga, Rebecca Reijman, and Achmad Albar. The film was released on July 29, 2010, and was a co-operative production from Bintang Timur Films, and  Dreamcatcher Pictures, and was distributed by Starvision Plus.

Plot
 
Elmo (Agung Saga) chooses to leave his parents' mansion after his father is found guilty in a corruption case. He lives a hard life as a street fighter at night, and still manages to attend school in the daytime.  His friend  Neina (Rebecca Reijman) knows that the reason he still goes to school is his love for Aprilia (Aurelie Moeremans), the daughter of a local mogul, Baskara (Ahmad Albar).

References

Indonesian drama films
2010s Indonesian-language films
Films shot in Indonesia
Films directed by Helfi Kardit